David Charles Hodge (born September 27, 1948, in Stewartville, Minnesota) was the 21st president of Miami University in Oxford, Ohio.  He began his tenure on July 1, 2006. Previously he was the Dean of the College of Arts and Sciences at the University of Washington, where he was also chair of the Department of Geography. Hodge was born and raised in Minnesota and earned a bachelor's degree in 1970 from Macalester College and earned a doctorate in 1975 from Pennsylvania State University; both were in geography.  On May 1, 2015, Hodge announced his intention to retire from the Miami presidency on June 30, 2016.

External links
Official Biography
 Cincinnati Enquirer Photograph of David Hodge

1948 births
Living people
People from Stewartville, Minnesota
Presidents of Miami University
University of Washington faculty
Penn State College of Earth and Mineral Sciences alumni
Macalester College alumni